Ab Cheshmeh (also Romanized as Āb Cheshmeh) is a village in Hendmini Rural District, Badreh District, Darreh Shahr County, Ilam Province, Iran. At the 2006 census, its population was 891, in 167 families. The village is populated by Lurs.

References 

Populated places in Darreh Shahr County
Luri settlements in Ilam Province